Masbaraud-Mérignat (Limousin: Lo Mas de Barèu e Mairinhac) is a former commune in the Creuse department in the Nouvelle-Aquitaine region in central France. On 1 January 2019, it was merged into the new commune Saint-Dizier-Masbaraud.

Geography

Population

Sights
 Traces of the abbey of Mérignat, dating from the eleventh century.
 The chapel, dating from the twentieth century.

Personalities
 Raymond Poulidor, French racing cyclist, was born here on the family farm in 1936.

See also
Communes of the Creuse department

References

Former communes of Creuse
Populated places disestablished in 2019